Kinar (Well in Malayalam), titled Keni in, is a 2018 Indian drama film co-written and directed by M. A. Nishad. It was produced by the studio of Fragrant Nature Film Creations, and was made simultaneously in Malayalam and Tamil. Focusing on the issue of water scarcity in a town between Kerala and Tamil Nadu, the film stars Jaya Prada and Revathi, with different sets of ensemble cast for the two versions. M. Jayachandran and Bijibal composed the soundtrack and score. Noushad Sherif was director of photography and Sreekumar Nair edited the film. Both versions were released worldwide on 23 February 2018. The Malayalam version received positive reviews while the Tamil version received negative reviews. Both versions were box-office bombs.

Cast 

Tamil
M. S. Bhaskar 
Chaams
Pandi

Production 
Directed by Malayalam filmmaker M. A. Nishad, the story revolves around a water dispute that crops up between the people of Tamil Nadu and Kerala on account of a well, with the film taking place in 1965 when Kerala was formed as a separate state. Jaya Prada revealed that her political experience of seeing people through problems of water scarcity motivated her to sign the film and play the lead role. Portraying the widow of a geologist, who wants to fulfil her husband's desire to make water available to all, she stated the story "fell in the category of ‘meaningful cinema’"  and that she was keen to be a part of such attempts. Revathy was signed to portray a collector of the Tamil Nadu village of Thirunelveli, which faces a water shortage every year. She was selected after the original choice, Suhasini opted out citing date issues. Nishad chose to shoot two versions, one in Malayalam and the other in Tamil, where each party would have the stronger cause.

The Malayalam version of the film was shot first during May 2017, with most of the scenes being shot at the Punalur Municipality and Chemmanthur High School premises. Scenes were also shot in Thiruvananthapuram during the same month, where a launch ceremony was held. The film was later shot in Tamil with Parthiban, Nassar, Anu Hasan and Rekha amongst others joining the cast.

Soundtrack

The film features a song titled "Ayya Sami", sung by S. P. Balasubrahmanyam and K. J. Yesudas, who worked together after a break of twenty seven years following Thalapathi (1991) for the song "Kaatukkuyilu Manasukkula". The song's lyrics narrates the celebration of Tamil Nadu and Kerala cultures, and was composed by M. Jayachandran and written by B. K. Harinarayanan and Palani Bharathi. The soundtracks were released simultaneously at an event on 7 February 2018, with the lead cast in both languages in attendance.

Malayalam version

Tamil version

Release
The Malayalam version received positive reviews for its bold take, but the Tamil version received negative reviews with the portions retained from Malayalam being criticized.

References

External links

2018 films
Indian multilingual films
Films shot in Tirunelveli
Films shot in Kollam
Films shot in Thiruvananthapuram
2010s Malayalam-language films
2010s Tamil-language films
Films scored by M. Jayachandran
Films about water scarcity
2018 multilingual films
Films directed by M. A. Nishad